The men's 1500 metres event at the 1966 European Indoor Games was held on 27 March in Dortmund.

Results

References

1500 metres at the European Athletics Indoor Championships
1500